Juan Martínez (born 25 September 1946) is a Spanish former freestyle swimmer who competed in the 1968 Summer Olympics. He was born in Las Palmas.

References

1946 births
Living people
Sportspeople from Las Palmas
Spanish male freestyle swimmers
Olympic swimmers of Spain
Swimmers at the 1968 Summer Olympics
Swimmers at the 1967 Mediterranean Games
Mediterranean Games gold medalists for Spain
Mediterranean Games medalists in swimming
20th-century Spanish people